Leone is the second-largest city on Tutuila Island's west coast. The village is on the south-west coast of Tutuila Island, American Samoa. Leone was the ancient capital of Tutuila Island. Leone was also where the Samoan Islands’ first missionary, John Williams, visited on October 18, 1832. A monument in honor of Williams has been erected in front of Zion Church. Its large church was the first to be built in American Samoa. It has three towers, a carved ceiling and stained glass. Until steamships were invented, Leone was the preferred anchorage of sailing ships which did not risk entering Pago Pago Harbor. Much early contact between Samoans and Europeans took place in Leone.

The village is home to some of the oldest buildings on Tutuila Island. Besides the oldest church in American Samoa, Leone is home to a post office, high school, Pritchard's Bakery, and Kruse Supermarket. Buses from Fagatogo to Leone leave every few minutes throughout the year. An airstrip was built at Leone during World War II. The village is home to two historical sites listed on the U.S. National Register of Historic Places: Fagalele Boys School, which may be the oldest building on Tutuila Island, and Tataga-Matau Fortified Quarry Complex.

Until the invention of the motorboat, Pago Pago Harbor was of little value as the ships were unable to turn around in such a confined area. The most common anchorage was therefore in Leone, where the first missionaries also arrived. Its strategic location, directly over the southern horizon from Upolu Island, and the district Atua, has made Leone a major resting port for those traveling between Upolu, Tutuila, and the Manu'a Islands. Leone is now a lively municipal center. The origin of several of Leone's chiefly titles can be traced to Western Samoa.

Etymology
The name originated from a famine that devastated Tutuila Island before modern history. Oral history shared through generations of ancestry recorded that Leone did not experience starvation nor the lack of food during this famine. Instead, the village had an abundance of food and other necessities, hence the name “Leone” which derives from “Le” (No) and “One” (Famine). During this famine, the villagers in Leone provided food and commodities for nearby villages and for families from a farther distance. This has earned the village the prestigious title “Leone o le Tinā o le Alofa”, which means “Leone is the Mother of Love.” The village's musical emblem is a living recording of this historical representation.

History

19th century
When missionary John Williams returned to the Samoan Islands in 1832, he dropped anchor in Leone Bay, but did not want to go directly ashore as he feared it was A'asu, site of the massacre of French sailors. Williams was surprised when a village chief paddled out to his ship to assure him that it would be safe to come ashore.

On October 11, 1839, Commodore Charles Wilkes of the United States Exploring Expedition visited Leone. Midshipman William Reynolds was assigned surveying duty under Lieutenant Joseph Underwood. In the village, they were introduced to Chief Tuitele, who was happy to welcome them as guests for the night. In his diary, Reynolds described the gentleness and civility of the villagers. He wrote: “I noticed in the men, a fondness & care displayed towards their children,” and went on to write: “While on the beach many huge fellows had infants & babbling youngsters in their arms.” He later questioned whether “these people have more claim to be good than we.” Reynolds promised Chief Tuetila that he would clothe “him as a Papalangi” (white person) if he would show up to their ship on their return. The chief came, but Captain Charles Wilkes refused to see Chief Tuetila.

In 1857, due to the large interest among locals for Christianity and its teachings, the Fagalele Boys School was established. The school's purpose was to train locals to become missionaries. Later, the school became a part of the Congregational Christian Church in American Samoa (CCCAS). In 1862, the Roman Catholic Church arrived in Leone under the stewardship of Father Elloy. The Catholics initially encountered strong opposition from some of the village chiefs. On April 17, 1900, four of its traditional chiefs, PCs Tuitele and Faiivae, and HTCs Olo and Leoso (Tama Matua), signed the Deed of Cession, which officially formed the current relationship with American Samoa and the United States. Leone is the only village to have had this unique recognition and honor.

On June 18, 1888, Elder Joseph Henry Dean founded the first branch of the Church of Jesus Christ of Latter-day Saints at Leone.

20th century
In the early 1900s, the Roman Catholics established the Marist Brothers School in Leone as a consequence of the unification of all Tutuila public schools. The Girls School at Leloaloa and the Boys School at Anua, Atu'u were also soon constructed. The all-girl secondary school was constructed by the London Missionary Society (LMS) on the edge of Afao, in Atauloma, which was completed by the year 1900. The building was situated on a 70 by 116 feet concrete slab which faced the sea. It functioned as an educational institution until the 1960s, and in the 1970s, it was leased to the ASG Government, which converted the building into apartments. It fell back in the hands of the LMS in 1995.

In 1920, the roads were in such condition that a roundtrip from Leone to Pago Pago, a distance of around 16 miles, took an entire day. In 1922, the Leone Rapid Transit began operations, announcing two trips per day at a round trip fare of $2.00. It was a result of $30,000 earmarked for road construction by Governor Waldo A. Evans. A June 8, 1922 report states there was a bus service from Pago Pago to Utulei and from Utulei to Leone. The Leone Rapid Transportation also operated between Fagatogo and Leone. Road conditions were such that it took the whole day to cover the distance of sixteen miles between Leone and Fagatogo.

Leone was selected in 1932 as one of four meeting places for the Bingham Commission of the U.S. Congress, which was sent to Pago Pago to study and report on complaints by Samoans against the Naval Administration. As a result of the commission's review, major changes were implemented by the Naval Administration for the betterment of both Tutuila Island and Manu'a. The Bingham Commission's hearings resulted in two major reforms: A Bill of Rights was created, and separation was established between the positions of Judge and Secretary of Native Affairs. The Bill of Rights was drafted by Governors Henry Francis Bryan and Edward Stanley Kellogg and Judge H.P. Wood.

From the 1920s until just after World War II, Leone gained a reputation for its siapo mamanu. In the book Siapo: Barkcloth Art of Samoa artist Mary J. Pritchard described her experiences learning siapo from the women of Leone at this time. One woman, Kolone Fai'ivae Leoso, emerged as an influential prolific and figure designer. Her compositions were often inspired by the stained glass windows of the Leone Congregational Church. Leoso died in 1970.

Leone was home to a bomber airstrip, known as Leone Airfield, which was completed on September 30, 1943. Leone High School and Midkiff Elementary School are situated today where the airfield once was located. It was abandoned in early 1945 due to turbulent air currents and lack of use. The airstrip was meant to be a Marine Corps fighter strip, but only a total of two airplanes were able to land and take off before the strip was declared unsafe due to the turbulent air currents.

In October 1982, residents in Leone celebrated the 150th anniversary of the first missionary, John Williams. The Catholic Church in town celebrated the 100th anniversary of the Sisters School, which was established in Leone in 1883 by Sisters Mary St. Vincent, St. Claire, and St. Thérese.

Modern times

The highest-ranking Samoan military serviceman to lose his life in the War in Iraq, U.S. Marine Lt. Col. Max Galeai, was killed in Karmah, Iraq on June 26, 2008. He was from Leone and is buried in the village.

Leone had the most victims in American Samoa in the 2009 tsunami. A memorial garden - Leone Healing Garden - was created on the So Poloa family land, where most of the 11 victims were found. The garden commemorates the loss of the 2009 tsunami that killed 22 and injured hundreds of Leone residents. Located just offshore are remnants of a fishing ship that was damaged by the 2018 cyclone Gita.

In 2011, Leone Post Office was dedicated and replaced an older one destroyed by the 2009 tsunami.

In 2012, Samoa's Prime Minister Tuilaepa Sailele Malielegaoi suggested American Samoa construct a wharf at Leone Bay in order to reduce the travel time between Samoa and Tutuila. It is approximately forty miles between Upolu Island and Tutuila.

In December 2012, a police substation was dedicated in Leone. The new station was constructed with federal funds.

On November 1, 2014, a drive-by shooting took place in Leone. Several gunshots were fired at the front of the Leone Police Substation. No officers or other personnel were injured. Four bullets were later recovered from inside the station. Four men were charged for the shooting, which took place when two police officers were inside the station.

Tsunami 

Leone was devastated by a tsunami on September 29, 2009. The tsunami was generated by a magnitude 8.0 undersea earthquake. Eleven people in Leone were killed by the tsunami. The victims were two children and nine adults, including elderly parents. The day of the tsunami is called the “Black Tuesday” and the village has erected a special monument known as Leone Healing Garden (Garden of Healing). The monument is near the seaside of the main road, and it was erected in order to commemorate the passing and to celebrate the lives of those who perished in the tsunami.

Demographics

The population as of the 2010 U.S. Census was 1,1919, which was a significant decrease from 3,568 recorded at the 2000 U.S. Census. The reason for this population decline was residents relocating to the United States for higher education and employment. Others have returned home to Western Samoa since the closing of Van Camp Tuna Industry in 1997.

The population of Leone went from 1,652 as of 1980 to 3,013 residents in 1990. This increase represented an annual growth rate of around 8.2%. The proportion of residents born outside American Samoa doubled from 1980 to 1990. The village was home to 443 housing units as of 1990. Construction permits were issued for 117 new homes between 1990–95, increasing the number of total housing units to 560.

Geography

Leone is a village situated southwest on Tutuila Island in American Samoa, reached by Route 1 from Pago Pago. It borders the villages of Puapua and Vailoatai to the south, Malaeloa Aitulagi to the east, and Amaluia to the west. It lies at the foothills of Malaloto Ridge by Leone Bay. Leone Falls and Leone Quarry are inland following Leafu Stream from the coast. It is located in Lealataua County. The village is situated on Leone Bay and the village spreads across flat land on Leone Plain.

It is situated on the southwestern tip of Tutuila Island and is recognized as Fofo County due to its earlier connection to Samoan legends and historical events. It is 13 miles west of Pago Pago. Niuavēvē Rock in Leone Bay is an islet with an old coconut tree, enduring natural disasters, generations after generations. Vailoa is located south of the village at Leone Bay, however, its coast consists of a low, rugged coastline, rather than sandy beaches as in Leone.

Pala Lagoon is a long stretch of swamp beginning from the main bridge on the road back to the foot of the mountains. The swamp has been a natural resource for marine life growth and is home to a number of bird species. Aualii Stream and Leafu Stream flow down from Mulimauga Ridge and through the village before discharging into Pala Lagoon. Leone has a large number of mangrove trees which have come back to normal after the destruction caused by the 2009 tsunami. The village is home to large parcels of fertile land used for farming and livestock. The soil is excellent for planting and growing yams of all kinds, bananas, talo, papayas, coconut trees for copra products, vegetables, and many other crops that are sold in grocery stores and at the Fagatogo Market. The coastline of Fagatele, an area in Leone, is made up of lava rocks, which were historically utilized to shape and grind stone tools.

Leone Pala Special Management Area
In 2013, American Samoa received a $269,000 National Coastal Wetland Conservation Grant. The grant will be used by the American Samoa Department of Commerce in order to restore 18.3 acres of coastal wetland habitat in Leone. The Leone wetland area is one of the largest and most important mangrove swamps in American Samoa and was designated as a Special Management Area in 1900.

Dominant vegetation in Leone's mangrove wetland includes the swamp fern, the oriental mangrove, red mangrove, and seashore paspalum.

Leone Falls 
Leone Falls is a waterfall with a freshwater pool used for swimming. The waterfall is reached by following the road up past the grey Catholic church near the town center to the end of the pavement. Then follow the dirt path to the head of the valley, where the waterfall is located. An artificial catchment barrier is placed at the bottom, which creates a pool used for swimming. The waterfall is also enhanced by a water pipe on the side of the falls. The falls are closed on Sundays due to religious observances.

Barry's Bed & Breakfast is a motel in a quiet residential area of Leone near the waterfalls.

Petroglyphs
Leone is one of three places in American Samoa where prehistoric petroglyphs have been discovered. The petroglyphs were the first to be discovered in the territory when they were found during Dr. Yosihiko Sinoto’s archeological site surveys in 1961 and 1962. The petroglyphs include two representations of what is assumed to be two octopuses, fe'e. Another petroglyph is that of a turtle, laumei, while the fourth figure seems to represent a human figure. The petroglyphs are located in the Leone Lagoon on an intrusive shelf of ash called Papaloa. It consists of three shelves separated by two eroded channels of shallow water. The length of the shelf is around 150-200 feet.

The Leone Bay petroglyphs take the form of figurative engravings or rock carvings and have been engraved into the stone surface by pecking (hammering the stone with a sharp instrument), bruising (rubbing the surface with another stone), and abrading (a combination of bruising and pecking). In 1966, rock previously covered with algae was exposed and more petroglyphs were discovered. These took the shape of what appeared to be an octopus, a jellyfish, a turtle, and an incomplete human figure.

Politics
Leone has been described as the “capital” of the Western District.

The village council banned the establishment of foreign-owned and operated businesses in 2002.

Economy
As of 2000, there were 47 registered commercial enterprises in the village of Leone. They included 8 grocery stores, 7 bus- and taxi services, 7 retail stores, 5 wholesale operations, 3 professional services, 2 landscaping businesses, 2 bakeries, a cable service business, a janitorial service, a fast-food restaurant, a car repair, a pool hall, a laundromat, Noela's Gas Station, a commercial diving contractor, a silk screen printing service, and a distributor of amusement machines. Commercial crop production and subsistence farming occur in the Leone watershed.

Leone Quarry

The fifty-acre Tatagamatau quarry above Leone is the largest in existence. It has been entered into the U.S. National Register of Historic Places. It is the most important archeological site in all of American Samoa. Various historical artifacts made of stone, some from as far away as Micronesia, have been discovered at this site. Archeologists Helen Leach and Dan Witter investigated the quarry in 1985. They discovered cutting tools, basalt adzes and pre-form tools. The quarry is also home to a star mound, similar to those found in the village of ‘Aoa. The basalt quarry in Leone can be visited. Although it is on community land, the hiking trail is owned by Tony Willis.

The Historic Preservation Office (HPO) did an investigation of the Tatagamatau adze quarry site in Leone, and revealed the site to be the oldest and largest of its kind in western Polynesia. It is also the only fortified adze quarry in the world.

Historical sites

Historical sites in Leone include the two listings on the U.S. National Register of Historic Places: Leone Quarry and Fagalele Boys School as well as Siona Church. Other sites include:

 Numiatoga (Fagatele), which is an area towards Leone's east coast. From this settlement of the 16th century Tongans, the warriors of Tutuila Island went to war with the Tongans under the leadership of Fuā'autoa, who later became known as Mauga. The Tongans were startled by the surprise attack, and they sailed away and promised to never to return to Tutuila as warriors, but rather as partners and peacemakers.
 Mauga o Alii (Mountain of Chiefs). In prehistoric times, villagers would hear loud ringing sounds from the middle of the tall mountains behind the village just before the death of a prominent chief. It was a premonition in the premodern days; according to some of the elders, the ringing sounds can still be heard today.
 A historic monument dedicated to Reverend John Williams is located in front of the Leone Congregational Christian Church (Siona).

A memorial woman sculpture is located by the sea and was placed there in order to signify the site where the first missionaries arrived in Leone.

Sports
Leone's Moso’oi women's cricket team was the American Samoa national women's cricket champion for several years. The Leone Whites village rugby team has been the American Samoa Rugby Union's champion for a number of years. Leone teams have also participated in softball championship leagues and volleyball tournaments. Several residents of Leone have become football players in the National Football League (NFL), including Joe Salave'a, Gabe Reid, Eddie Siaumau, and Samoa Samoa.

Leone is the birthplace and hometown of Jaiyah Saelua, an American Samoan Soccer player who was the first transgender player to play in a FIFA World Cup qualifier.

Landmarks
 Leone Quarry: Most important archeological site in American Samoa.
 Fagalele Boys School: May be the oldest building on Tutuila Island.
 John Williams' Church (Zion Church): Oldest church in American Samoa.
The church has a monument to John Williams, Samoa's first missionary.
 Leone Healing Garden
 Leone Falls
 Pritchard's Bakery

Education
American Samoa Department of Education operates public schools, including Leone High School and Midkiff Elementary School.

Notable people
Jaiyah Saelua, first transgender player to play in a FIFA World Cup qualifier, born and raised in Leone
Joe Salave'a, NFL player and football coach
Tauese Sunia, former Governor of American Samoa
Napoleon Andrew Tuiteleleapaga,  author, poet and musician
Andra Samoa, chief executive and environmentalist
Sika Anoa'i, wrestler
Jerome Kaino, rugby player
John Kneubuhl, screenwriter and historian
Shalimar Seiuli, dancer, attended Leone High School
Sven Ortquist, West Samoan artist, lived in Leone

References 

Villages in American Samoa
Tutuila